A taper insertion pin is a tool used for enlarging holes for body modification purposes. 

It is a long metal rod with one end having a slightly larger diameter than the other. Tapers are usually used for expanding piercings in order to accommodate larger plugs. Even at smaller gauges, tapers are not meant to be worn as jewellery, and are typically used for assisting in the placement  of rings or plugs. 

Most tapers are constructed from surgical stainless steel, but can also be found in acrylic or polished stone. Most of these items are also sold with o-rings, which are small rubber bands to help keep piercings in place.

Body piercing